Voitinel is a commune located in Suceava County, Bukovina, Romania. It is composed of a single village, Voitinel, part of Gălănești commune until 2004.

References

Communes in Suceava County
Localities in Southern Bukovina
Duchy of Bukovina